Petrea Webster (born 30 March 1988) is a New Zealand field hockey player. She has competed for the New Zealand women's national field hockey team (the Black Sticks Women) since 2011, including at the 2014 Women's Hockey World Cup. She will compete for the team at the 2014 Commonwealth Games.

Born in Auckland, Webster was selected for the Black Sticks in February 2011, and played her first test against Japan the following month. She works as a physical education teacher at Carmel College on Auckland's North Shore.

References

External links
 

1988 births
Living people
Field hockey players from Auckland
New Zealand female field hockey players
Field hockey players at the 2014 Commonwealth Games
Commonwealth Games bronze medallists for New Zealand
Field hockey players at the 2016 Summer Olympics
Olympic field hockey players of New Zealand
Commonwealth Games medallists in field hockey
Medallists at the 2014 Commonwealth Games